Nahunta is an unincorporated community in Wayne County, North Carolina, United States, on North Carolina Highway 581.

References

 

Unincorporated communities in Wayne County, North Carolina
Unincorporated communities in North Carolina